Democratic Left Front (Sri Lanka) (Prajathanthravadi Vamanshika Peramuna) is a political party in Sri Lanka. The party is both a member of the Freedom People's Alliance (FPA), a prominent opposition party in Sri Lanka, and the Supreme Lanka Coalition, an alliance of seven leftist and nationalist political parties in Sri Lanka led by Wimal Weerawansa.

DLF leader Vasudeva Nanayakkara is currently the sole representative of the DLF in the Sri Lankan Parliament, from the Ratnapura district.

References

External links
Slelections.gov.lk

Political parties in Sri Lanka
Socialist Alliance (Sri Lanka)
United People's Freedom Alliance
1999 establishments in Sri Lanka
Political parties established in 1999
Socialist parties in Sri Lanka